Mufti Mehmood (1919–1980) was a Pakistani politician and Islamic scholar who was one of the founding members of the Jamiat Ulema-e-Islam (JUI).

Early life and career
Born in January 1919, he was an ethnic Marwat Pashtun from Abdul Khel, Dera Ismail Khan District, colonial India (now Pakistan). He received his religious education at Madrasa Shahi, Moradabad, UP and graduated from the Darul Uloom Deoband. In 1941, he worked as a teacher in Isakhel, Mianwali.

At the time of the Indian independence movement Mufti Mahmud opposed the partition of colonial India and opposed the creation of Pakistan. In 1971, he infamously said “Thank God we were not part of the sin of making Pakistan.”

In Pakistan
He served as a Muhtamim at Jamia Qasim-ul-Uloom in Multan and later in his career, he also held the positions of Chief Mudarras in charge of Education, Chief Mufti, and Sheikh al-Hadith. He issued at least 25,000 Fatwas in his lifetime and his students included Maulana Abdullah Ghazi, Abdul Majeed Ludhianvi and Noor Muhammad.

Mufti Mahmud was a critic of family planning programme of Ayub Khan's government. He participated in the elections for the National Assembly for the first time under Ayub Khan's 'Basic Democracy Program' and defeated all his opponents in 1962. He also opposed the 'One Unit Scheme'.On 8 January 1968, in Dacca, then in East Pakistan, Mufti Mahmud was one of the key leaders of Jamhoori Majlis-e-Amal that opposed Ayub Khan's regime. In the 1970 General Elections, Mufti Mahmud had a landslide victory against Zulfiqar Ali Bhutto in the Dera Ismail Khan constituency.

After the 1970 General Elections in Pakistan, he became the president of Jamiat Ulema-e-Islam founded by Maulana Shabir Ahmed Usmani. His party went into a coalition with the National Awami Party & Pakistan Peoples Party for the 1970 Pakistani general election. In the 1970s, Jamiat Ulema-e-Islam received significant funding from Saudi Arabia.

On 1 March 1972, he was elected as the Chief Minister of the province of Khyber-Pakhtunkhwa during the Zulfiqar Ali Bhutto regime in Pakistan. He, along with his cabinet, resigned in protest at the dismissal of the NAP–JUI (F) coalition government in Balochistan on 14 February 1973.

During his tenure as Chief Minister, he introduced many reforms, such as forbidding the use of alcohol, announcing Urdu as the official language in Government offices, ban on interest in financial transactions and declared Friday as the official holiday in his province.

Mufti Mahmud played a vital role in Tehreek-e-Khatme Nabuwwat, a religious movement which has highlighted the beliefs of the followers of Mirza Ghulam Ahmad in Pakistan, in 1953 and again in 1974. He led a team of Islamic scholars which worked for the declaration of Ahmadis as non-Muslims in 1974.

He supported Afghan-Jihad against USSR in 1979 (see also Soviet–Afghan War).

Death and legacy
He died on 14 October 1980 in Karachi, Sindh at the age of 61. He was buried in his hometown Abdul Khel, Paniala, Dera Ismail Khan District. His son Fazal-ur-Rehman is a politician who leads the Jamiat Ulema-e-Islam (JUI) party in Pakistan.

Literary works
Tafsīr-i Maḥmūd, translation of and commentary on the Qur'an, in 3 volumes
Fatāvʹa Muftī Maḥmūd, his fatwas, in 11 volumes
Az̲ān-i saḥar: Maulānā Muftī Maḥmūd ke inṭerviyuz aur taqārīr kā majmūʻah, collected speeches and interviews 
K̲h̲ut̤bāt-i Maḥmūd: majmūʻah-yi taqārīr-i mufakkir-i Islām, Maulānā Muftī Maḥmūd, collection of his speeches

Books about him
Savāniḥ-i ḥayāt: Muftī Maḥmūd, vazīr-i aʻlá-yi Sarḥad, janral sekraṭrī Jamʻiyat-i ʻUlamāʼ-yi Islām, Pākistān by Z̈iyāʼurraḥmān Fārūqī, 1972
Muftī Maḥmūd kī siyāsat by Nūrulḥaq Quraishī, 1974
Maulānā Mufti Mahmūd by Naʻim Āsī, 1977
Maulānā Muftī Maḥmūd ... kī siyāsī zindagī by Gul Nāyāb K̲h̲ān Citrālī, 2002
Mufakkir-i Islām, qāʼid-i Islāmī inqilāb Maulānā Muftī Maḥmūd ... ek darvesh siyāsatdān by Sayyid Anvar Qidvāʼī, 2003	
Savāniḥ qāʼid-i millat Ḥaẓrat Maulānā Muftī Maḥmūd by ʻAbdulqayyūm Ḥaqqānī, 2003
Muftī Maḥmūd kā daur-i ḥukūmat by Ashfāq Hāshmī, 2004
Maulānā Muftī Maḥmūd ke ḥairat angez vāqiʻāt by Momin K̲h̲ān ʻUs̲mānī, 2009
Muftī-yi Aʻẓam Maulānā Muftī Maḥmūd kī ʻilmī, dīnī aur siyāsī k̲h̲idmāt by ʻAbdulḥakīm Akbarī, 2010
Afkār-i Maḥmūd : Shaik̲h̲ulhind Maulānā Maḥmūd Ḥasan va mufakkir-i Islām Maulānā Muftī Maḥmūd kī ḥayāt o k̲h̲idmāt kā ḥasīn tazkirah by Muḥammad Fārūq Quraishī, 2017

See also
Jamiat Ulema-e-Islam (F)
Persecution of Ahmadis
Chief Ministers of Khyber Pakhtunkhwa
Syed Muhammad Miyan Deobandi

References

Bibliography

External links

|-

 

1919 births
1980 deaths
Pashtun people
Indian National Congress politicians
Indian independence activists from Pakistan
Chief Ministers of Khyber Pakhtunkhwa
People from Dera Ismail Khan District
Grand Muftis
Deobandis
Pakistani MNAs 1962–1965
Pakistani political party founders
Jamiat Ulema-e-Islam politicians
Presidents of Wifaq ul Madaris Al-Arabia
Madrasa Shahi alumni
Wifaq ul Madaris Al-Arabia people
Students of Muhammad Miyan Deobandi
General Secretaries of Wifaq ul Madaris Al-Arabia
Jamia Qasim Ul Uloom people